Estadio Miguel Morales is a stadium in Pergamino, Argentina. It has a capacity of 10,000 spectators.  It is the home of Club Atlético Douglas Haig of the Primera B Nacional.

References

Football venues in Argentina